Luis Alfonzo Larrain  (22 July 1911 – 4 July 1996), was a Venezuelan composer, music director and producer, sometimes known as the Magician of the dancing Music.

Luis Alfonzo Larrain died on 4 July 1996, in Caracas.

Some of his works: “Quisiera”, “Vente pa’ca”, “Amandanos”, “Dulce y Picante”, “El Morrocoy”, “El pon pon”, “Se que me Quieres”, “Rosendo”, “Oye mi Cancion”, “La Pelota”.

See also 
 Music of Venezuela

References

1911 births
1996 deaths
People from Aragua
People from Caracas
Venezuelan bandleaders
Venezuelan composers
Male composers
20th-century composers
20th-century male musicians
Death in Caracas